Ku Hyun-jun (born December 13, 1993) is a South Korean football player who currently plays as a left back for Busan IPark.

Club career 
Ku made his debut for Busan IPark on 27 June 2012 in a 5-2 defeat to Jeju United.

Ku completed his military service with K4 League side Siheung Citizen FC before returning to parent club Busan IPark midway through the 2021 K League 2 season.

Club career statistics

References

External links 
 

1993 births
Living people
South Korean footballers
Association football midfielders
K League 1 players
K League 2 players
Busan IPark players